This is a list of the French SNEP Top 100 Singles, Top 50 Digital Singles, Top 200 Albums and Top 50 Digital Albums number-ones of 2007.

Number-ones by week

Singles charts

On the singles chart (top 100), there were twenty songs which spent at least one week at the first position, which is the highest turnover at the top of French SNEP Singles Chart on a year. Eleven of them went straight atop. The songs which spent the longest time at number-one are Christophe Willem's "Double Je" and Koxie's "Garçon", with seven weeks. The highest weekly sales were performed by Grégory Lemarchal's "De temps en temps" in its first week of release, with over 76,000 sales, while the lowest weekly sales are carried out by Nelly Furtado's "Say It Right" with about 7,100 copies sold. The biggest jump to number one was for Mika's hit "Relax, Take It Easy" which climbed directly from No. 70 to No. 1 on the chart edition of 7 July 2007. The longest chart run for a number-one single was performed by "Marly-Gomont" with 39 weeks in the top 100, and the shorter one by "On s'attache", which remained for only six weeks in the top 100. Fatal Bazooka was the sole artist to rank three singles at number-one on that year.

Albums chart

See also
2007 in music
List of number-one hits (France)
List of artists who reached number one on the French Singles Chart

References

Number-one hits
France
2007